Abandoned is a 2019 Philippine psychological horror film starring Beauty Gonzalez, Seth Fedelin, Allan De Paz, directed by Kip Oebanda and produced by Dreamscape Entertainment together with Quantum Films. The film was released on August 28, 2019, on iWantTFC.

Synopsis 
It is about a security guard who's a single mother, Simone (Beauty Gonzalez), who experiences post-horrendous pressure issues due to a theft that murdered her colleagues in the time of their work. She lives with her son Rj (Seth Fedelin), whom she buckles down for. After all incident, she was assigned as a security guard on a haunted and abandoned building. Peculiar events before long happen during her works day, making her think back to the agonizing past that promptly negatively affects her and her son Rj.

Cast 

 Beauty Gonzalez as Simone
 Seth Fedelin as Rj
 Allan De Paz as Renante
 Barbara Ruaro as Ciel
 Nico Antonio as Sol
 Matt Daclan as Nestor
 Archi Adamos as Ruel
 Iana Bernardez as Alice
 Kenneth Paul Cruz as Marko
 Rolando Inocencio as Simone's dad
 Shermaine Santiago as Simone's mom

Production 
The film was directed by Kip Oebanda and produced by Dreamscape Entertainment. The film was the first film project of Seth Fedelin, former housemate of Pinoy Big Brother Otso. Seth said that he was nervous during the shooting but he was motivated by his co-star and the director.

References

External links 

 

Philippine horror films
2019 horror thriller films